The Estadio Nemesio Díez (Nemesio Diez Stadium), nicknamed "La Bombonera" (The Chocolate Box) due to its shape, is one of the oldest football stadiums in Mexico. Opened on August 8, 1954, with a capacity of 27,273, it is located in the city of Toluca, State of Mexico, near Mexico City. It is the home of Deportivo Toluca Fútbol Club. This stadium has hosted two World Cups (1970 and 1986). A former nuance about this stadium is that it did not have a lighting system, which forced the local team as a tradition to play at noon. It is the only professional stadium in Mexico oriented from East to West, commonly by FIFA regulations, the orientation must be North to South.

The stadium was previously known as: Estadio Toluca 70–86, Estadio Toluca 70, Estadio Luis Gutiérrez Dosal and Estadio Héctor Barraza.

History
During the 1940s and 1950s, Toluca played its home games at a ground near downtown Toluca known then as Tivoli. Later, wooden stands were built in the ground and it was named Campo Patria. On that same spot, in 1953, the club started building its own stadium.

The stadium was inaugurated on Sunday 8 August 1954, with a match between Toluca and Yugoslavian team Dinamo Zagreb. The game was won by Dinamo 4–1. The only goal for Toluca and also the first in the history of the stadium was scored by Enrique Sesma.

Initially, the stadium was opened as Estadio Club Deportivo Toluca. That name lasted until 1955, when it was changed to Estadio Héctor Barraza. Other names the stadium has had are: Estadio Luis Gutiérrez Dosal (1959–1970), Estadio Toluca 70 (1970–1986), Estadio Toluca 70–86 (1986–2000).

After the death of Nemesio Díez Riega, president and then owner of the club, in June 2000, the stadium name was changed to Estadio Nemesio Díez.

Renovation (2015–2017)
With an investment of 800 million MXN (about 40 million USD), the announcement to remodel The Nemesio Diez stadium by 2017 was made, when Club Deportivo Toluca celebrates  its centenary and does so with a remodeled and more functional stadium.

Within the Nemesio Diez, four macro support columns that will sustain the stadium structure will be built to replace the current columns obstructing visibility. In the shadow stands, a second level will be built so the capacity, which currently stands at 22,000 will increase to 30,000.

The project also includes four giant screens at each end of the building, replacement of all seats and a sunroof in the preferred (shaded) section, to assist in the process of maintaining the natural grass in the field.

The remodeled stadium officially opened on January 15, 2017, with a league match against Club America. The first goal was scored by Gabriel Hauche for Toluca with a screamer outside of the box. Toluca FC won that match 2–1.

The stadium was completed in the summer 2017 where it had been confirmed that the club would play against Atlético Madrid for the official inauguration of the remodeled stadium.

Matches

1970 FIFA World Cup

1986 FIFA World Cup

Mexico national football team

Recognition and awards
Runner-up of the public vote "Stadium of the Year 2017" – Stadium DB.

See also

List of football stadiums in Mexico

References

External links

Stadium picture

Sports venues in the State of Mexico
Nemesio Diez
1970 FIFA World Cup stadiums
1986 FIFA World Cup stadiums
Sports venues completed in 1954
Toluca